Somporn is a Thai given name. Notable people with the name include:

 Somporn Juangroongruangkit (born 1950/51), Thai businesswoman
 Somporn On-Chim (born 1942), Thai sports shooter
 Somporn Saekhow (1940–2002), Thai farmer
 Somporn Wannaprapa (born 1988), Thai volleyball player
 Somporn Yos (born 1993), Thai footballer